Caloplaca kedrovopadensis is a little-known species of crustose lichen in the family Teloschistaceae. It is only found in the Kedrovaya Pad Nature Reserve in the Russian Far East, and on the Jiri Mountain of South Korea. The lichen has been recorded growing on rocks and on bark.

Taxonomy
Caloplaca kedrovopadensis was formally described as a new species in 2014 by lichenologists Sergei Kondratyuk and Jae-Seoun Hur. The type specimen was collected by the authors from the Land of the Leopard National Park in Khasansky District (Primorsky Krai). It is only known from the type locality; the species epithet refers to the Kedrovaya Pad Nature Reserve, which contains the type locality.

Description
The crustose thallus of Caloplaca kedrovopadensis is thin, continuous to cracked, and greenish-yellow in colour. It has many apothecia (spore-bearing structures), which measure 0.3–0.55 mm in diameter. Its asci can hold eight spores, but they often instead have 1, 2, 4, or sometimes 6 of the mature, bipolar spores. These ascospores are spindle-shaped (fusiform) with tapered ends, split into two cells by a central septum (hence, "bipolar"), and measure 19–26 by 8.5–10 μm.

Habitat and distribution
Both of the Korean collections were found growing on bark. Phaeophyscia exornatula, Verrucaria species, and Aspicilia species are other lichens that have been noted to grow in close association with Caloplaca kedrovopadensis.

See also
List of Caloplaca species

References

kedrovopadensis
Lichen species
Lichens described in 2014
Lichens of Asia
Taxa named by Sergey Kondratyuk
Lichens of the Russian Far East